The MP 40 (Maschinenpistole 40) is a submachine gun chambered for the 9×19mm Parabellum cartridge. It was developed in Nazi Germany and used extensively by the Axis powers during World War II.

Designed in 1938 by Heinrich Vollmer with inspiration from its predecessor the MP 38, it was heavily used by infantrymen (particularly platoon and squad leaders), and by paratroopers, on the Eastern and Western Fronts as well as armoured fighting vehicle crews. Its advanced and modern features made it a favorite among soldiers and popular in countries from various parts of the world after the war. It was often called "Schmeisser" by the Allies, after Hugo Schmeisser, who designed the MP 18, although he was not involved in the design or production of the MP 40. The weapon's other variants included the MP 40/I and the  MP 41. From 1940 to 1945, an estimated 1.1 million were produced by Erma Werke.

Development

The Maschinenpistole 40 ("Machine pistol 40") descended from its predecessor the MP 38, which was in turn based on the MP 36, a prototype made of machined steel. The MP 36 was developed independently by Erma Werke's Berthold Geipel with funding from the German Army. It took design elements from Heinrich Vollmer's VPM 1930 and EMP. Vollmer then worked on Berthold Geipel's MP 36 and in 1938 submitted a prototype to answer a request from the Heereswaffenamt (Army Weapons Office) for a new submachine gun, which was adopted as MP 38. The MP 38 was a simplification of the MP 36, and the MP 40 was a further simplification of the MP 38, with certain cost-saving alterations, most notably in the more extensive use of stamped steel rather than machined parts.

The MP 40 was often called the "Schmeisser" by the Allies, after the weapon designer Hugo Schmeisser. Schmeisser had designed the MP 18, which was the first mass-produced submachine gun. He did not, however, have anything to do with the design or development of the MP 40, although he held a patent on the magazine.

Design

The MP 40 submachine guns are open-bolt, blowback-operated automatic arms. The only mode of fire is automatic, but the relatively low rate of fire permits single shots with controlled trigger pulls. The bolt features a telescoping return spring guide which serves as a pneumatic recoil buffer. The cocking handle was permanently attached to the bolt on early MP 38s, but on late-production MP 38s and MP 40s, the bolt handle was made as a separate part. It also serves as a safety by pushing the head of the handle into one of two separate notches above the main opening; this action locks the bolt in either the cocked (rear) or uncocked (forward) position. The absence of this feature on early MP 38s resulted in field expedients such as leather harnesses with a small loop that were used to hold the bolt in the forward position.

The MP 38 receiver was made of machined steel, but this was a time-consuming and expensive process. To save time and materials, and thus increase production, construction of the MP 40 receiver was simplified by using stamped steel and electro-spot welding as much as possible. The MP 38 also features longitudinal grooving on the receiver and bolt, as well as a circular opening on the magazine housing. These features were eliminated on the MP 40.

One feature found on most MP 38 and MP 40 submachine guns is an aluminum, steel, or Margolit (a variation of Bakelite) resting bar under the barrel. This was used to steady the weapon when firing over the side of open-top armored personnel carriers such as the Sd.Kfz. 251 half-track. A handguard, also made of Margolit, is located between the magazine housing and the Margolit pistol grip. The barrel lacked any form of insulation, which often resulted in burns on the supporting hand if it was incorrectly positioned. The MP 40 also has a forward-folding metal stock, the first for a submachine gun, resulting in a shorter overall weapon when folded. However, this stock design was at times insufficiently durable for hard combat use.

Although the MP 40 was generally reliable, a major weakness was its 32-round magazine. Unlike the double-column, staggered-feed magazine found on the Thompson M1921/1928 variants, the MP 40 uses a double-column, single-feed version. The single-feed insert resulted in increased friction against the remaining cartridges moving upwards towards the feed lips, occasionally resulting in feed failures; this problem was exacerbated by the presence of dirt or other debris. Another problem was that the magazine was also sometimes misused as a handhold. This could cause the weapon to malfunction when hand pressure on the magazine body caused the magazine lips to move out of the line of feed, since the magazine well did not keep the magazine firmly locked. German soldiers were trained to grasp either the handguard on the underside of the weapon or the magazine housing with the supporting hand to avoid feed malfunctions.

Usage

At the outbreak of World War II, the majority of German soldiers carried either Karabiner 98k rifles or MP 40s, both of which were regarded as the standard weapons of choice for an infantryman.

However, later confrontations with Soviet troops such as the Battle of Stalingrad, where entire enemy units were armed with PPSh-41 submachine guns, the Germans found themselves out-gunned in short range urban combat which caused a shift in their tactics, and by the end of the war the MP 40 and its derivatives were sometimes issued to entire assault platoons. Starting in 1943, the German military moved to replace both the Karabiner 98k rifle and MP 40 with the new, revolutionary StG 44. By the end of World War II in 1945, an estimated 1.1 million MP 40s had been produced of all variants.

Post-war use
During and after the end of World War II, many MP 40s were captured or surrendered (upwards of 200,000) to the Allies and were then redistributed to the paramilitary and irregular forces of some developing countries. The Norwegian army withdrew the MP 38 from use in 1975 but used the MP 40 for some years more. In particular, the Territorials (Heimevernet) used it until about 1990, when it was replaced by the Heckler & Koch MP5.

Variants

MP 40/I
The MP 40/I (sometimes erroneously called MP 40/II) was a modified version of the standard MP 40 with a dual side-by-side magazine holder (for a theoretical ammunition total of 64 rounds), designed for special operations troops on the Eastern Front to compensate for the enemies' PPSh-41 larger magazine capacity. However, the design proved unsuccessful due to weight and reliability issues. Authentic versions, in addition to the dual mag magazine well, also have a smaller buttpad and shortened ejector.

MP 41

In 1941, Hugo Schmeisser designed the MP 41, which was, in reality, an MP 40 upper receiver with a lower receiver of an MP 28 submachine gun. It saw limited service, however, and was issued only to SS and police units in 1944. The MP 41 was also supplied to Germany's Axis ally Romania.

Later in 1941, rival company Erma Werke sued Haenel, at which Schmeisser was Chief Designer, for patent infringement. Production subsequently ceased on the MP41.

Influence on later weapons 
The MP 38 and MP 40 also directly influenced the design of later weapons, including the Spanish Star Z45, the Yugoslavian Zastava M56, and the semi-automatic German Selbstladebüchse BD 38 replica.

Details of the MP 40 have also been adopted in other submachine guns, which otherwise differ significantly from a technical point of view:

 The designers of the American M3 "Grease Gun" examined British Sten guns and captured MP 40s for usable construction details.  
 The folding stock became the model for those on later weapons, such as the Soviet PPS-43 and the AKS and AKMS versions of the AK-47.
 The MP 40 magazine can also be used in the Belgian Vigneron submachine gun.

Users

During World War II, the resistance and the Allies sometimes captured MP 40s to replace or supplement their own weapons. The MP 40 was used for several decades following World War II by many countries around the world in armed conflicts. Some found their way into guerrilla groups such as the Viet Cong or African guerrillas.

Its operators have included:

: The National Liberation Army used MP 40s supplied by Czechoslovakia and Yugoslavia.

: Around 160 were delivered together with German vehicles during the Continuation War; after the war they were used by prison administration before being retired in the 1970s
: French resistance used captured guns during World War II. MP 40s were also carried by French Army in the French Indochina and French Algeria.

 : MP 38/40 supplied in 1954 from Czechoslovakia, still in service with the police at the end of the Guatemalan Civil War.

: Used during the 1948 Arab-Israeli War and by Unit 101 before replaced by the Uzi.
: Used in small numbers by the 55th Airborne Brigade and Iranian Imperial Guards.
  Italian Partisans: Used examples captured from German soldiers.
 Kosovo Liberation Army
: Used by the Wehrmacht, military police, Gestapo, Waffen-SS, Volkssturm, and Hitler Youth at the end of war.
: Post war, used by the Papuan Volunteer Corps during West New Guinea dispute.

: Captured MP 40s were used by Polish rebels during World War II.

: Captured MP 40s were used by Soviet partisans and Worker-Peasant Red Army. After the war, the MP 40 with other weapons, were sold to others countries in the Eastern Bloc.
: Copied as the Star Model Z-45.
: Used by the South Vietnamese Popular Force.
 : Used against Israel.
 : An unknown quantity seen in the hands of Ukrainian forces during 2022 Russian invasion of Ukraine.
: Captured MP 40s used by United States during World War II and by Special Forces and their Civilian Irregular Defense Group program at the beginning of the Vietnam War. Some also apparently captured in the Iraq War.
: Captured from the French Far East Expeditionary Corps and used by the Viet Minh, the Viet Cong and the People's Army of Vietnam.

 : Used by ZIPRA and ZANLA.

Civilian ownership in the United States 
During the Allied occupation of Germany starting in 1945, U.S. servicemen shipped home thousands of captured firearms as war trophies, including MP 40s. This practice required proper registration of automatic weapons in accordance with the National Firearms Act before they could be imported, but this was curtailed later in the occupation, meaning a relatively small number of civilian-transferable original German MP 40s remain in circulation and are valued at around $20,000-37,500 as of 2021, with some selling for almost $50,000.

After the commercial importation of complete machine guns was banned by the Gun Control Act of 1968, MP 40 parts kits (the disassembled parts of the gun excluding the receiver tube) were imported and reassembled onto receivers manufactured in the United States by Charles Erb, Wilson Arms, and others. These remanufactured legally transferable machine guns, colloquially called "tube guns", are (depending on quality of construction and condition) generally valued at 50-75% of the price of original German MP 40s, as they do not have their historical background. As such, they are commonly used for recreational range shooting and WW2 historical reenactments, because the associated wear and tear (within reasonable limits) will not significantly diminish their value, as it would on original collectible examples. Manufacture of new tube guns ceased following the passage of the Firearm Owners Protection Act in 1986.

There are several semi-automatic variants and cosmetic replicas of the MP 40 available for civilian ownership in the U.S. Beginning in 2014, American Tactical Imports began importing an MP 40 replica manufactured by German Sporting Guns GmbH chambered in .22LR, and since 2016 has also imported a pistol variant chambered in 9mm. The .22LR variant features an all-metal construction with period-accurate Bakelite furniture, a folding stock, and a faux-suppressor to meet barrel length import requirements. The 9mm variant is classified as a pistol and therefore does not ship with a folding stock. Both variants are closed-bolt, blowback-operated semi-automatic firearms that vary substantially from originally manufactured MP 40s in internal operation, making them more of an affordable cosmetic replica than a faithful reproduction. Neither of the GSG-manufactured variants are compatible with originally manufactured MP 40 parts and magazines.

See also
List of common World War II infantry weapons
List of submachine guns
List of World War II firearms of Germany

References

Sources

External links

Website dedicated to the MP 38, MP 40 and MP 41
Gunworld article on the MP 40 
The Schmeisser MP41: A Hybrid Submachine Gun

9mm Parabellum submachine guns
Erma Werke firearms
MP 38 derivatives
Simple blowback firearms
Submachine guns of Germany
Weapons and ammunition introduced in 1940
World War II infantry weapons of Germany
World War II submachine guns